Kidal Region (Bambara: ߞߌߘߊߟ ߘߌߣߋߖߊ tr. Kidal Dineja) the eighth administrative region of Mali, covering . This area was formerly part of Gao Region, but was created as a separate region in 1991. It is located in the north of the country, within the territory which the National Movement for the Liberation of Azawad proclaimed to be the independent nation-state of Azawad on 6 April 2012. This independence has not been recognized by any country or international organization. It was under the control of different armed movements such as the Ansar Dine and MNLA until January 2013, when French forces liberated the region. The Region's administrative capital is the town of Kidal.

Geography
The region is bordered on the west by Tomboctou Region, to the south by Gao Region, to the east by Niger and to the north by Algeria.

Kidal has a desert climate with day-time temperatures that reach as high as 45 °C (113 °F).

In 2009 the region had a population of 67,638. In addition 30% of its population, mostly Tuareg and Songhai were displaced to North Africa during the 1990s.

The largest towns of the region are Kidal, Tessalit, and Aguel'hoc.

Transportation and economy
The primary trades of Kidal Region include livestock breeding, craft-making, and commerce. Commercial farming has been developed in some areas. The region is extremely isolated, with no paved highways or rivers for transportation.

History
The region saw Tuareg Rebellions in 1963–1964 and in 1990–1991. The accords of Tamanresset followed on January 6, 1991, creating the Kidal Region by decree on August 8, 1991.

By the end of 2011, another group of Tuareg rebels, the National Movement for the Liberation of Azawad, were active in the region. The Movement declared Azawad to be an independent republic in April 2012, with the Kidal region as part of the new (but unrecognised) state.

Culture
The region is peopled primarily by Tuaregs, a nomadic ethnicity of Berber origin. Their writing is the Tifinagh alphabet.

Though nomadism remains the lifestyle best adapted to the difficult environment of the region, several settlements have emerged at Kidal: Aguel'hoc, Tessalit, and Tinzawatène.

Administrative subdivisions

Kidal Region is divided into four cercles encompassing 11 communes:

See also
 Cercles of Mali
 Regions of Mali

References

 This article is based on a translation of the corresponding article from the French Wikipedia, retrieved on July 8, 2005.

External links
 Kidal info (French)
 .

 
Regions of Mali
Tuareg